Fiderd Vis (born March 29, 1981) is a judoka from Aruba. He competed in the 2008 Summer Olympics in Beijing, China, and was the flag-bearer for his nation during the opening ceremonies of those games.

External links
Athlete bio at 2008 Olympics official website

Aruban male judoka
Judoka at the 2008 Summer Olympics
Olympic judoka of Aruba
Judoka at the 2007 Pan American Games
Pan American Games competitors for Aruba
1981 births
Living people